Julián Isaac Sánchez Gallegos (born 22 August 1988 in Mexico City) is a Mexican diver. He won one gold and one silver medal in the 2011 Pan-American Games. He competed at the 2012 Summer Olympics in the men's synchronised springboard diving, with Yahel Castillo, finishing in 7th place.

References

1988 births
Mexican male divers
Divers at the 2011 Pan American Games
Pan American Games gold medalists for Mexico
Pan American Games silver medalists for Mexico
Divers at the 2012 Summer Olympics
Olympic divers of Mexico
Divers from Mexico City
Living people
World Aquatics Championships medalists in diving
Pan American Games medalists in diving
Universiade medalists in diving
Universiade silver medalists for Mexico
Medalists at the 2011 Summer Universiade
Medalists at the 2011 Pan American Games
21st-century Mexican people